Yuval David is an American actor, filmmaker and activist. As an actor he has played various roles including that of Matvey Sokolov in the television series Madam Secretary and a regular on What Would You Do?. His film-making includes directing and producing, including the creation of man on the street performances. His work has been screened in over 100 film festivals and won more than 80 awards. David is also advocates for rights of the LGBT community, the Jewish community, environmental and humanitarian causes.

Early life and education
 
David's grandparents were survivors of The Holocaust and he was raised in both Israel and Washington D.C. He began performing in theatre, voice overs, film and television at a young age. He went to Charles E. Smith Jewish Day School prior to attending the University of Maryland on an acting scholarship where he studied the arts, film, acting, and journalism. While there he was a member of Kol Sasson, UMD’s premiere Jewish Acappella group.

Career
 
After college, David moved to New York to pursue acting. He traveled between New York City and Los Angeles and took roles in theatre, television, and film, including off-Broadway plays and independent films. He also played Matvey Sokolov in the television series Madam Secretary and was a series regular on What Would You Do?.
 
David is the creator of film projects using man on the street encounters. One such series is One Actor Short where he has people he meets on the street act in short films. His work has been screened at more than 100 film festivals and won over 80 awards.
 
As an activist, David advocates for rights of the LGBT community, including acceptance and inclusion of LGBTQ people within religious communities and the prohibition by the FDA on the use of blood plasma from donors based on sexual orientation. He has also partnered with organizations such as the National LGBTQ Task Force and GLAAD He also advocates on behalf of Jewish, LGBTQ, and human rights organizations in the United States and Israel.

Filmography

Actor

Filmmaker

References

External links
 Official website
 

Year of birth missing (living people)
Living people
American actors
American filmmakers
University System of Maryland alumni